USS Montclair (ID-3497) was a United States Navy refrigerated cargo ship in commission from 1918 to 1919.

Construction, acquisition, and commissioning
Montclair was built in 1918 as the British commercial refrigerated cargo ship SS War Speed for the Cunard Line by the Standard Shipbuilding Corporation at Shooters Island, New York. She soon was renamed SS Montclair.  On 19 August 1918, the United States Shipping Board took control of Montclair via the Emergency Fleet Corporation at Brooklyn, New York, and immediately turned her over to the U.S. Navy, which assigned her the naval registry identification number 3497 and commissioned her that same day as USS Montclair (ID-3497) for use in World War I .

Operational history
Assigned to the Naval Overseas Transportation Service, Montclair joined a convoy out of New York City on 7 October 1918 with a cargo of beef and a deckload of trucks, but she was unable to maintain convoy speed. Because of this and because of machinery deficiencies, she was ordered to drop out of the convoy on 8 October 1918 and proceed to Norfolk, Virginia, for repairs.

With her repairs completed, Montclair was directed to join up with a convoy scheduled to depart New York on 19 October 1918. She made a successful transatlantic crossing this time, and arrived at Quiberon, France, on 6 November 1918; she discharged her cargo at St. Nazaire that day. The war ended while she was in France, on 11 November 1918.

Montclair departed Quiberon on 14 November 1918 for a westbound voyage, but after weathering a gale she was forced to put in for repairs and fuel at Bermuda. She arrived at New York on 15 December 1918. She then completed two more transatlantic cargo runs to St. Nazaire in France and Rotterdam in the Netherlands, completing the second of these on 20 May 1919.

In June 1919, Montclair was directed to proceed to Galveston, Texas, to take on a load of onions destined for St. Nazaire. A few days out of Galveston during the voyage to St. Nazaire, it was found that the temperature and condition of the cargo in the holds was such that decay had set in, and Montclair was ordered to divert to Norfolk. Upon her arrival there on 25 June 1919 it was decided to place her in line for demobilization.

Decommissioning and disposal
Montclair was decommissioned at Norfolk on 7 July 1919, and the Navy returned her to the U.S. Shipping Board the same day. Once again SS Montclair, she continued to operate as a refrigerated cargo ship under U.S. Shipping Board ownership until 1932. She was scrapped at Baltimore, Maryland, in 1937.

References

Department of the Navy: Naval Historical Center Online Library of Selected Images: U.S. Navy Ships: USS Montclair (ID # 3497), 1918-1919. Originally the civilian refrigerator ship War Speed, which was renamed Montclair in 1918
NavSource Online: Section Patrol Craft Photo Archive: Montclair (ID 3497)

 

Auxiliary ships of the United States Navy
World War I cargo ships of the United States
Ships built in Staten Island
1918 ships
Standard World War I ships
Steamships of the United States